Doner may refer to:

People
Jeremy Doner (born 1972), American scriptwriter
Jordan Doner, American photographer and visual artist
Kitty Doner (1895–1988), American vaudeville performer
Michele Oka Doner (born 1945), American artist and author
Morey Doner (born 1994), Canadian soccer player
Rodger Doner (born 1938), Canadian wrestler

Other
Ministry for Development of North Eastern Region (abbreviated DoNER), a ministerial department of India
Doner kebab, meat cooked on a vertical rotisserie
Doner Company, an American advertising agency

See also
Donor
Donar (disambiguation)
Donner (disambiguation)